= Jhoja =

Jhoja Rajput surname

Regions with significant populations
- India, United Kingdom

Languages
- Gujarati • Punjabi • Rajasthani • Hindi

Religion
- Hinduism • Sikhism • Islam

Jhoja (Joja; Hindi: जोजा (झोजा); Urdu: جھوجہ; Gujarati: જોજા; Punjabi: ਜੋਜਾ (ਝੋਜਾ)) is a Rajput surname that is common among the Kshatriya Hindus and the Sikhs of Northern India.

There are also Muslim Rajputs within the Jhoja clan. However, due to religious customs and naming conventions, Muslim Jhojas typically do not use "Joja" as a surname but rather retain it as a caste identity. These Muslim Rajputs are primarily found in regions of Uttar Pradesh and Uttarakhand, where they maintain their distinct cultural and historical lineage within the broader Rajput community.
